Acropora granulosa is a species of acroporid coral found in the northern and southwest Indian Ocean, the Red Sea, Australia, the East China Sea, Japan, the oceanic central and western Pacific Ocean, and the central Indo-Pacific. It was described by Milne Edwards in 1860 and is classified as near threatened by the IUCN.

Description
It is found in colonies composed of a single horizontal plate of branches with a diameter below . Branches are evenly spaced and branchlets are short and inclined. Each branchlet has at least one incipient axial and axial corallite, and its small radial corallites are pocket-shaped. There are no known similar-looking species, and it is mostly pale blue, cream or grey in colour.

Distribution
It is classed as a near threatened species on the IUCN Red List and it is believed that its population is decreasing; the species is listed under Appendix II of CITES. Figures of its population are unknown, but is likely to be threatened by the global reduction of coral reefs, the increase of temperature causing coral bleaching, climate change, human activity, the crown-of-thorns starfish (Acanthaster planci) and disease. It occurs in the northern and southwest Indian Ocean, the Red Sea, Australia, the East China Sea, Japan, the oceanic central and western Pacific Ocean, and the central Indo-Pacific.

Taxonomy
It was described as Madrepora granulosa by Milne Edwards in 1860.

References

Acropora
Corals described in 1860
Near threatened animals